Gregory Melleuish (born 1954) is an Australian associate professor of history and politics at the University of Wollongong. Subjects he teaches include Australian politics, political theory, world history and ancient history. Previously, he taught European history at the University of Melbourne and Australian Studies at the University of Queensland. He occasionally contributes opinion pieces for The Australian, The Conversation and On Line Opinion.

Political leanings
Melleuish is a political conservative, who supports liberalism and admires the conservative philosopher Edmund Burke. In his occasional columns, he often advocates laissez-faire economic policies  and criticises the way history is taught in Australian schools and universities. His main interests include:

 Australian political culture
 Australian intellectual history with an emphasis on political, cultural and religious ideas
 World history, in particular the role of the state, war and commercial activity.

Bibliography 

Cultural Liberalism in Australia: A study in intellectual and cultural history (CUP 1995)
The Packaging of Australia: Politics and culture wars (UNSW Press 1998)
A Short History of Australian Liberalism (CIS 2001)
Union Amongst the Colonies (Australian Scholarly Publishing 2001) (with John West)
Blaming Ourselves: September 11 and the agony of the left (Duffy & Snellgrove 2002) (edited with Imre Salusinszky)
The Power of Ideas: Essays on Australian politics and history (Australian Scholarly Publishing 2009)
Australian Intellectuals: Their strange history and pathological tendencies (Connor Court 2013)
 
The Forgotten Menzies: The world picture of Australia's longest-serving prime minister, co-authored by Stephen A. Chavura (Melbourne University Press 2021)

References

External links
 Profile of Gregory Melleuish
 Online opinion page
 Greg Melleuish's University of Wollongong page and list of academic publications
 Gregory Melleuish – The Conversation

Australian historians
Australian political scientists
Living people
1954 births
Academic staff of the University of Wollongong
Quadrant (magazine) people